KEUN-FM (105.5 FM) is a radio station licensed to Eunice, Louisiana, United States, and serving St. Landry Parish and surrounding areas. Owned by Dane Wilson, through licensee Cajun Prairie Broadcasting, LLC., which is owned by Wilson, it broadcasts a contemporary country and Cajun music format every day except Saturdays, when it plays Cajun music from 5 a.m. to 6 p.m.

History
According to its website, the station went on the air October 22, 1981, with the original callsign of KJJB. Originally a 3,000 watt station, its power was reduced to 1000 watts ERP when the tower height was increased from 91 meters to 148 meters in 2001.

References

External links
105-5 KEUN Facebook

Radio stations in Louisiana